Citizen Center is a metro station on Line 4 and Line 7 of the Hangzhou Metro in China. It is located in the Shangcheng District of Hangzhou.

The station opened on 2 February 2015, together with the rest ones of phase I initial section on Line 4.

It has become a transfer station between Line 4 and Line 7 after 17 September 2021 when Line 7 opened with this station as terminus.

On 1 April 2022, when phase I remaining section of Line 7 was opened, its new terminus became  so this station became a passerby.

References

Railway stations in Zhejiang
Railway stations in China opened in 2015
Hangzhou Metro stations